Chimkhola is a village in Myagdi District in Gandaki Province of western-central Nepal. At the time of the 1991 Nepal census it had a population of 1456 people living in 270 individual households.

References

External links
UN map of the municipalities of Myagdi District

Populated places in Myagdi District